Peter Beckford (junior) (1672–3 – 1735) was a politician, slave owner and businessman in early colonial Jamaica.

Early life

Peter Beckford junior was the son of another Peter Beckford, founder of one of the most powerful families on the island, and briefly acting governor of the colony. Like his father, Beckford junior had a severe temper. As a young man, he was accused of killing the Deputy Judge Advocate of Jamaica in a fit of temper, but was acquitted after a lengthy court case.

Political career

Peter junior joined the House of Assembly of Jamaica and became the Speaker. During a debate in 1710, things became extremely heated and some members drew their swords and threatened him. The Governor responded to shouts for assistance and the doors of the chamber were forced open. The Assembly was dissolved in the name of the Queen. The aged Peter Beckford senior was amongst those who had come to his rescue. In the general confusion, he slipped and fell down the long staircase. Suffering a mortal injury, he died soon after.

In 1720, Peter junior was one of the prominent people in Jamaica about whom the governor Sir Nicholas Lawes complained had "anarchical principles". He went into business with Alexander Grant, leasing a storehouse from which the partners sold supplies to other plantation owners.

Personal life and legacy

Peter married Bathshua Herring and they had thirteen children, including William in 1709, who was twice Lord Mayor of London, and Elizabeth, who became Countess of Effingham.

When Peter died in 1735, his will included a legacy of £2,000 to found a school in Spanish Town, then the capital of Jamaica, which was started there in 1744. This school merged with another school started with £3,000 donated by Francis Smith forming the Beckford and Smith School in 1869. In 1956, the school renamed St. Jago High School.

Role as a slave owner

At his death, Beckford had amassed a huge personal fortune, including black slaves, of whom he was sole owner of 1737 and half owner of 577 others.

William emigrated to England and had a prominent career in politics, defending the West India Interest, where he lobbied against the abolition of slavery, first as a Member of Parliament and then as Lord Mayor of London.

References

 Oxford Dictionary of National Biography

1670s births
1735 deaths
Jamaican politicians
Jamaican people of English descent
Jamaican businesspeople
17th-century Jamaican people
18th-century Jamaican people
Peter
Founders of British schools and colleges
British slave owners